Eri Naam Prem is a 2006 romantic Bengali film directed by Sujit Guha and produced by Naresh Kumar Jain under the banner of Eskay Movies. The film features actors Koel Mallick and Anubhav Mohanty in the lead roles. Music of the film has been composed by Jeet Ganguly.

Cast 
 Koel Mallick as Rina
 Anubhav Mohanty as Akash
 Mrinal Mukherjee
 Soma Dey
 Kaushik Banerjee
 Subhasish Mukhopadhyay
 Dola Chowdhury
 Premjit Mukherjee
 Abdur Razzak
 Raja Chattopadhyay

Soundtrack

See also 
 List of Bengali films of 2006

References 

2006 films
Bengali-language Indian films
2000s Bengali-language films
2000s romance films
Films directed by Sujit Guha
Indian romance films